Jorge Carlos Soler Castillo (born February 25, 1992) is a Cuban professional baseball outfielder for the Miami Marlins of Major League Baseball (MLB). Soler has previously played in MLB for the Chicago Cubs, Kansas City Royals, and Atlanta Braves.

Soler played for the Cuban national baseball team in international competition. He defected from Cuba in 2011, seeking a career in MLB. After establishing residency in Haiti, Soler signed a nine-year contract with the Cubs. He made his MLB debut in 2014 and won the 2016 World Series with the Cubs. The Cubs traded Soler to the Royals after the 2016 season. He led the American League in home runs in 2019. Traded to Atlanta in 2021, Soler won the 2021 World Series and earned the World Series Most Valuable Player Award. Soler signed with the Marlins before the 2022 season.

Cuban career
Soler played for the Cuban national baseball team in the 2010 World Junior Baseball Championship, where he had a .304 batting average, .500 on-base percentage, and .522 slugging percentage.  His nine walks were the second most in the tournament. Cuba won the bronze medal. Soler also played briefly with the Industriales in the Cuban National Series.

Soler defected from Cuba in 2011 to pursue his career in Major League Baseball (MLB). He established residency in Haiti. Soler was unblocked by the Office of Foreign Assets Control on June 2, 2012, making him an MLB free agent. As a free agent, many teams were involved in bidding on Soler.

Scouting profile
He was described as a power-hitting outfielder who would likely play right field. Jim Callis of Baseball America described Soler in 2011 as  "a 19-year-old athlete with five-tool potential." According to Callis, Soler likely would have been a top-five pick in the 2010 draft had he been eligible. Kevin Goldstein of Baseball Prospectus did not rank Soler in his list of the top baseball prospects prior to the 2012 season, but said he would have ranked Soler as the 38th or 39th best prospect if he were eligible. Some teams preferred Soler to higher profile Cuban defector Yoenis Céspedes. Keith Law of ESPN.com indicated that Soler had the talent of a top-five draft choice in the 2012 Major League Baseball Draft, had he been eligible to be drafted. Writing for Fox News, Mauricio Rubio wrote that "Early in his career he was benched for not hustling, and in a separate incident he ran toward an opposing dugout with a bat." Writing for the Sporting News, Jeff Mans noted that: "The biggest issue with Soler aside from the hamstring injuries is his temper.... He started out on the wrong foot with the Cubs after failing to report to minor league camp shortly after signing his nine-year, $30 million deal, feeling that he should have been in Chicago immediately. The other scare for the Cubs brass was his relative inability to hit righthanded pitching."

American career

Minor League Baseball
On June 11, 2012, Soler reportedly agreed to a nine-year $30 million contract with the Chicago Cubs. The Cubs had reportedly agreed to a deal with Soler before he was declared a free agent, though Cubs general manager Jed Hoyer denied this. He made his professional debut that same season with the AZL Cubs and was promoted to the Peoria Chiefs in August. In 34 games between the two teams he batted .299 with five home runs and 25 RBIs.

On April 10, 2013, while playing on the Daytona Cubs, immediately following a bench-clearing incident, Soler charged the opposing Clearwater Threshers' dugout while brandishing a baseball bat.  He was ejected from the game, was fined, and received a five-game suspension. Soler spent all of 2013 with Daytona, slashing .281/.343/.467 with eight home runs and 35 RBIs in 55 games.

Soler began the 2014 season with the Tennessee Smokies. On July 22, 2014, after batting .415/.494/.862 with six home runs and 22 RBIS in 22 games, Soler was promoted to the Iowa Cubs.

Chicago Cubs
On August 25, 2014, Soler was called up to the Chicago Cubs for the first time. In 32 games for Iowa prior to his call up he was batting .282 with eight home runs and 29 RBIs in 32 games. In his major league debut on August 27, facing Cincinnati Reds pitcher Mat Latos, Soler hit a home run in his first major league at-bat, becoming the 117th player in MLB history to do so. On September 1 Soler had two doubles in his home debut for the Cubs to become just the third major league player in the last 100 years to have at least one extra-base hit in each of his first five games in the majors. Two days later Soler became the second player in Cubs history with as many as 10 RBIs in his first seven games as a major leaguer. Soler was the starting right fielder for the Cubs 2015 season until an ankle injury sidelined him in early June. He returned to the starting lineup on July 5 after spending time in rehab. He finished the regular season with a .268 batting average, 15 home runs and 67 RBIs.

In 2015, Soler's postseason debut, he walked as a pinch-hitter in the ninth inning in Game 1 of the Division Series and followed up with a double, two-run home run to straightaway center and two more walks in Game 2, and another home run, a single and two walks in Game 3. Record setting Soler  started his postseason career by reaching base nine times in a row, in which he recorded five walks and hit two home runs, a double and a single. In Game 4 Soler ended a game-tying St. Louis Cardinals sixth inning rally with an outfield assist on a game-saving  inning-ending put out of Tony Cruz at home plate. The Cubs won the game 6–4 and  beat the rival St. Louis Cardinals in four games to advance to the National League Championship Series.

Soler's playing time with Chicago dipped in 2016, playing in 86 games compared to 101 the previous year. The Cubs were the most dominant team for the entirety of the regular season, entering the  postseason as the favorites. Through 13 at-bats in the playoffs, Soler totaled 4 strikeouts, 3 walks, and two hits. Both of his hits came in the  World Series. The more notable of the two was a triple in Game 3 off of  Bryan Shaw. The Cubs went on to win the 2016 World Series over the Cleveland Indians in seven games.

Kansas City Royals
On December 7, 2016, the Cubs traded Soler to the Kansas City Royals for Wade Davis. After a string of injuries and inconsistency at the plate, Soler was demoted to the Omaha Storm Chasers on June 2. In 74 games for Omaha he batted .267 with 24 home runs and 59 RBIs, and in 35 games for Kansas City, he compiled a .144 batting average with two home runs and six RBIs.

Soler began the 2018 season as Kansas City's starting right fielder. However, after suffering a toe fracture in mid-June, he was sidelined for the remainder of the year. Over 61 games, he hit .265 with nine home runs. Soler returned from the injury in 2019, splitting time between right field and designated hitter. On September 3, 2019, he hit his 39th home run of the season, becoming Kansas City's record holder for most home runs in a single season. The very next night, Soler became the first Royals player in history to record at least 40 home runs in a single season.

In 2019, he batted .265, and led the American League with 48 home runs and 178 strikeouts in 589 at bats. His home run total was the most ever in a single season by a Cuban-born player. 

In the 2020 pandemic-shortened season, Soler batted .228 with eight home runs and 24 RBIs in 43 games. At the beginning of the 2021 season with Kansas City, he batted .192/.288/.370 in 308 at bats.

Atlanta Braves
On July 30, 2021, Soler was traded to the Atlanta Braves for Kasey Kalich. 

In 2021, he batted .223/.316/.432 with 27 home runs and 70 RBIs in 516 at bats between the Royals and the Braves. With the Braves, he hit .269/.358/.524. His home runs averaged 423 feet, the longest average home run distance of all major league hitters.

In his first start after spending 10 days on the COVID-19 injured list, Soler hit a leadoff home run in Game 1 of the 2021 World Series off of Framber Valdez, becoming the first player to hit a home run in the first plate appearance of a World Series. In Game 4, Soler hit a pinch-hit go-ahead home run in the seventh inning to give the Braves a 3–2 lead, which led them to a 3–1 lead in the World Series. In Game 6, he hit his third home run of the series, a 446-foot, three run shot to give the Braves a 3–0 lead.

Miami Marlins
On March 22, 2022, Soler signed a three-year contract with the Miami Marlins.

Personal life 
Soler married Leydis Serrano in the early 2000s.

See also

 Kansas City Royals award winners and league leaders
 List of baseball players who defected from Cuba
 List of Kansas City Royals team records
 List of Major League Baseball players from Cuba
 List of Major League Baseball players with a home run in their first major league at bat

References

External links

 

1992 births
American League home run champions
Arizona League Cubs players
Atlanta Braves players
Chicago Cubs players
Cuban expatriate baseball players in the United States
Cuban expatriates in Haiti
Daytona Cubs players
Defecting Cuban baseball players
Iowa Cubs players
Kansas City Royals players
Living people
Major League Baseball outfielders
Major League Baseball players from Cuba
Mesa Solar Sox players
Miami Marlins players
Omaha Storm Chasers players
Peoria Chiefs players
Baseball players from Havana
Tennessee Smokies players
Vaqueros de la Habana players